Pipoidea are a clade of frogs that have variously been defined as a suborder (original definition), superfamily, or an unranked node-based taxon. There is no single, authoritative higher-level classification of frogs, and Vitt and Caldwell (2014) use name Xenoanura for a similar clade, skipping Pipoidea altogether, as did Frost et al. (2006).

In 1993 Pipoidea was defined by Ford and Cannatella as the node-based taxon that contains the most recent common ancestor of living Pipidae and Rhinophrynidae as well as all its descendants:

The synapomorphies that define Pipoidea are the absence of mentomeckelian bones, absence of lateral alae of the parasphenoid, fusion of the frontoparietals into an azygous element, greatly enlarged otic capsules, and a tadpole with paired spiracles and which lacks beaks and denticles. Later genetic work has supported Pipoidea as a monophyletic group.

The oldest record of the group is Rhadinosteus from the Late Jurassic of North America, which is more closely related to Rhinophrynidae than to Pipidae. The oldest records of the Pipimorpha, which contains all pipoids more closely related to Pipidae than to Rhinophrynidae, are during the Early Cretaceous.

References

 
Taxa named by Raymond Laurent